Burkett Nunatak is a nunatak,  high, standing  east of Minaret Nunatak, in the Monument Nunataks, Victoria Land, Antarctica. The geographical feature was mapped by the United States Geological Survey from surveys and from U.S. Navy air photos, 1960–64, and named by the Advisory Committee on Antarctic Names for Willis A. Burkett, an aviation electronics technician of U.S. Navy Squadron VX-6. Burkett made six deployments with Operation Deep Freeze expeditions and participated in over 100 flights to McMurdo Sound. The nunatak lies situated on the Pennell Coast, a portion of Antarctica lying between Cape Williams and Cape Adare.

References 

Nunataks of Victoria Land
Pennell Coast